George Bartlett may refer to:

George A. Bartlett (1869–1951), American politician
George Bartlett (cricketer) (born 1998), English cricketer
George Bartlett (rugby league) (born 1968), Australian rugby league player
George True Bartlett (1856–1949), U.S. Army general